Carta is Latin and Italian for "paper" and is Spanish and Portuguese "letter". In English it takes the form  "card" or "chart".  Most of its uses pertain to its meaning as "paper", "chart", or "map", for example in Magna Carta.

Carta may refer to:

Carta (publisher), an Israeli publishing and mapping company
Carta (software company), a software company from Palo Alto, California
Carta (material), a trade name for FR-2, a composite material used in the manufacture of printed circuit boards

People with the surname
Angelico Carta (1886-?), Italian military officer
Antonella Carta (born 1967), Italian footballer
Fabio Carta (born 1977), Italian short track speed skater
John Carta (1946–1990), American parachutist
Marco Carta (born 1985), Italian singer
Maria Carta (1934–1994), Italian singer-songwriter

See also
 CARTA (disambiguation)
 Cârța (disambiguation)
 Karta (disambiguation)